Chiché or Chiche may refer to:

 Chiché, Guatemala, a municipality in the department of El Quiché
 Chiché, Deux-Sèvres, a commune in France
 Chiche (surname)